The Pebble Beach Concours d'Elegance is held annually in Monterey, California. Of the various awards given at the car show, the finale and most significant is the Best of Show. As of 2022, J.B. Nethercutt has the most individual victories at 6 while Bugatti and Mercedes-Benz are the most successful marquees at 9 wins each.

Best of Show winners

Multiple wins

Individual

Marquee

See also

 List of motor vehicle awards

References

External links

Concours d'Elegance